Emma Tate is a British voice actress. She is known for many roles including the voice of Perfect Peter in Horrid Henry, Harry in Harry and His Bucket Full of Dinosaurs, Raggles and Bluebird in Everything's Rosie, Katsuma and Luvli in Moshi Monsters: The Movie , Kipper in The Magic Key and Gran in Kazoops.

Career
Tate's acting debut came in a 1991 episode of The Bill and from 1999, she commenced work in voice acting, mainly in children's programmes, starting with the U.S. version of Bob the Builder and also on Dream Street, voicing Half-Pint the milk float. In 2006, Emma began to voice Perfect Peter in the TV adaptation of Francesca Simon's book Horrid Henry.

In 2010, she began to appear with Horrid Henry co-star Joanna Ruiz in Everything's Rosie, voicing the main characters. Ruiz voices the title character while Tate voices Raggles the rabbit. In the 2013 video game Broken Sword 5: The Serpent's Curse, she voices the female lead Nicole Collard and other minor roles. She also provided voices for the Warcraft expansion Battle for Azeroth in 2018.

Filmography

Film roles

Television roles

Video games

Other

References

External links
 

Living people
20th-century British actresses
21st-century British actresses
British television actresses
British video game actresses
British voice actresses
Place of birth missing (living people)
Year of birth missing (living people)